The Surgeon's Cut is a 2020 docuseries starring Lin Gallagher.

Cast 
 Lin Gallagher

Episodes

Release 
The Surgeon's Cut was released on December 9, 2020, on Netflix.

References

External links 
 
 

Netflix original documentary television series
English-language Netflix original programming
2020 American television series debuts
2020 American television series endings
Television series by BBC Studios